Cronia is a genus of sea snails, marine gastropod mollusks in the family Muricidae, the murex snails or rock snails.

Species
Species within the genus Cronia include:
 Cronia amygdala (Kiener, 1835)
 Cronia aurantiaca (Hombron & Jacquinot, 1853)
 Cronia avellana (Reeve, 1846)
 † Cronia tengawaica Laws, 1933 
Species inquirendum
 Cronia obockensis (Jousseaume, 1888)
Species brought into synonymy
 Cronia amygdata [sic]: synonym of Cronia amygdala (Kiener, 1835) (misspelling)
 Cronia avenacea (Lesson, 1842): synonym of Usilla avenacea (Lesson, 1842)
 Cronia contracta (Reeve, 1846): synonym of Ergalatax contracta (Reeve, 1846)
 Cronia coronata (A. Adams, 1853): synonym of Pinaxia coronata A. Adams, 1853
 Cronia crassulnata (Hedley, 1915): synonym of Ergalatax crassulnata (Hedley, 1915)
 Cronia fiscella (Gmelin, 1791): synonym of Muricodrupa fiscellum (Gmelin, 1791): synonym of Murichorda fiscellum (Gmelin, 1791)
 Cronia heptagonalis (Reeve, 1846): synonym of Ergalatax heptagonalis (Reeve, 1846) (synonym)
 Cronia iostoma (A. Adams, 1853): synonym of Murex iostoma A. Adams, 1853: synonym of Spinidrupa euracantha (A. Adams, 1853) (synonym)
 Cronia konkanensis (Melvill, 1893): synonym of Semiricinula konkanensis (Melvill, 1893)
 Cronia latiaxidea (G. B. Sowerby III, 1894): synonym of Lataxiena fimbriata (Hinds, 1844) (synonym)
 Cronia margariticola (Broderip in Broderip & Sowerby, 1833): synonym of Drupella margariticola (Broderip, 1833)
 Cronia marginatra (Blainville, 1832): synonym of Neothais marginatra (Blainville, 1832)
 Cronia martensi (Dall, 1923): synonym of Ergalatax junionae Houart, 2008
 Cronia muricina (Blainville, 1832): synonym of Semiricinula muricina (Blainville, 1832)
 Cronia ochrostoma (Blainville, 1832): synonym of Pascula ochrostoma (Blainville, 1832)
 Cronia ozenneana (Crosse, 1861): synonym of Pascula ozenneana (Crosse, 1861)
 Cronia pseudamygdala (Hedley, 1903): synonym of Cronia aurantiaca (Hombron & Jacquinot, 1848)
 Cronia spinosa (Adams H. & A., 1853): synonym of Morula spinosa (H. Adams & A. Adams, 1853)
 Cronia subnodulosa (Melvill, 1893): synonym of Orania subnodulosa (Melvill, 1893)
 Cronia tosana (Pilsbry, 1904): synonym of Usilla tosana (Pilsbry, 1904)

References

External links
 Adams H. & Adams A. (1853-1858). The genera of Recent Mollusca; arranged according to their organization. London, van Voorst. Vol. 1: xl + 484 pp.; vol. 2: 661 pp.; vol. 3: 138 pls
 Claremont M., Houart R., Williams S.T. & Reid D.G. (2013). A molecular phylogenetic framework for the Ergalataxinae (Neogastropoda: Muricidae). Journal of Molluscan Studies. 79(1): 19-29

 
Ergalataxinae